List of Japan Coast Guard vessels and aircraft.

Fleet

PLH (Patrol Vessel Large With Helicopter)

 2 Helicopter class
 Shunkō class (ja)
 
 
 1 Helicopter class
 Reimei class (Modified Shikishima class)
 
 Ryūkyū class (Modified Tsugaru class)
 Soya class (ja)

PL (Patrol Vessel Large)

 3500 t class
 Miyako class (ja)
 Izu class (ja)
 2000 t class
 
 1000 t class
  (Kunisaki class)
 
 
 
  (Erimo class) (1 vessel from this class was transferred to Malaysia Maritime Enforcement Agency: PL 02)
 Oki (Nojima) (1 vessel from this class was transferred to Malaysia Maritime Enforcement Agency: PL 01)

Training role
 3000 t class
 Kojima (3rd) (ja)
 Miura
 Okoyama
 1100 t class
 Kojima (2nd) (ja)

PM (Patrol Vessel Medium)

 500 t class
 Katori class (ja) 
 Teshio class (2nd) (ja)
 Teshio class (Natsui class)
 350 t class
 Tokara class
 Amami class
 Takatori class

PS (Patrol Vessel Small)

 220 t class
 
 180 t class
 Bizan class (Raizan class)
 Mihashi class (Shinzan class)
 Shimoji class
 130 t class
 Takatsuki class (ja)

PC (Patrol Craft)
 35 m class
 Yodo class (ja) 
 Hamagumo class
 Matsunami
 Hayanami class
 30 m class
 Kagayuki class (Hayagumo class)
 Asogiri class
 Murakumo class
 23 m class

 Kotonami class (ja) 
 Natsugiri class
 Shimagiri class
 Akizuki class

CL (Craft Large)
 20 m class
 Suzukaze class (ja) (Himegiku class)
 Hayagiku class
 Shiraume class
 15 m class
 Nadakaze class
 Isokaze class

FL (Fire fighting boat Large)
 Hiryū class (2nd) (ja) 
 Hiryū class (1st)

FM (Fire fighting boat Medium)
 Nunobiki class

GS (Guard Boat Small)
 Sagittarius class (Hayate class 2nd)
 Hayate class

SS (Surveillance Service Small)
 Lynx class
  Polaris class
 Orion class (2nd)
 Southern Cross class (Polaris class)
 Orion class (1st)

MS (Monitoring Boat Small)
 Katsuren
 Saikai
 Kinugasa

HL (Hydrographic Survey Vessel Large)

 Heiyō class (2nd) (ja)
 Shōyō (2nd)
 Meiyō class (2nd)
 Tenyō (2nd)
 Takuyō (2nd)
 Shōyō (1st)
 Meiyō (1st)
 Takuyō (1st)

HM (Hydrographic Survey Vessel Medium)
 Kaiyō (1st)
 Tenyō (1st)
 Heiyō (1st)

HS (Hydrographic Survey Vessel Small)

 Hamashio class (3nd) (ja) 
 Jinbei
 Hamashio class (2nd)
 Akashi class
 Hamashio class (1st)
 Takashima class
 Isogo class
 Hashima class
 Akashio class

LM (Light-House Service Vessel Medium)
 Hakuun class

LS (Light-House Service Vessel Small)
 Akihikari class
 Hatsuhikari class

TV (Training Vessel)
 CI class
 Aoba class

Aircraft inventory

References 

Vessels and aircraft
Japan Coast Guard vessels and aircraft
Coast Guard vessels and aircraft
Japan Coast Guard